Sinar is a clothing manufacturer headquartered in Novosibirsk, Russia. It was founded in 1921. The company produces men's, women's and children's clothing.

History

The garment factory was created in Novonikolayevsk (current Novosibirsk) on the basis of Igla Trade Union in 1921. It had 60 sewing machines and 55 workers.

In 1997, Sinar entered into an agreement with Vyacheslav Zaytsev.

In 2012, the company opened the first store in Krasnoyarsk.

In 2015, Sinar opened the ninth store in Novosibirsk.

Activity
The company sells clothing under the Sinar and Sono brands. The factory makes women's and men's coats, school clothes, suits, ties, etc.

Location
The company's stores are located in more than 30 cities of Russia.

Gallery

References

External links
 Нелегкий старт легкой промышленности. Континент Сибирь.
 Шьют 100 лет: новосибирцев пустят в старейшую швейную фабрику в центре города. НГС.НОВОСТИ.

Clothing companies established in 1921
Manufacturing companies based in Novosibirsk
Russian brands
Clothing companies of Russia
Clothing brands of Russia
Clothing manufacturers
Tsentralny City District, Novosibirsk